Ramil Khavisovich Kharisov (born 18 May 1977) is a former Russian football player.

Club career
He made his Russian Premier League debut for FC Chernomorets Novorossiysk on 11 July 2001 in a game against FC Spartak Moscow. That was his only season in the top tier.

References

1977 births
Footballers from Kazan
Living people
Russian footballers
Association football midfielders
FC Rubin Kazan players
FC Chernomorets Novorossiysk players
FC Neftyanik Ufa players
FC Sodovik Sterlitamak players
FC Orenburg players
FC KAMAZ Naberezhnye Chelny players
FC Dynamo Kirov players
Russian Premier League players